This article summarize the Japanese football in the 2020 season.

Men's football
For this season, as a result of the COVID-19 pandemic, there will be no relegation in place for the professional J1, J2 and J3 League, with the J1 League expanding to 20 clubs for the 2021 season. The Japan Football League curtailed its season to play only the second half and will have no promotion or relegation, thus expanding to 18 clubs for the 2021 season.

Promotion and relegation
Teams relegated from J1 League
 Jubilo Iwata
 Matsumoto Yamaga

Teams promoted to J1 League
 Kashiwa Reysol
 Yokohama FC

Teams relegated from J2 League
 Kagoshima United FC
 FC Gifu

Teams promoted to J2 League
 Giravanz Kitakyushu
 Thespakusatsu Gunma

Teams relegated from J3 League
 No relegation to the Japan Football League

Teams promoted to J3 League
 FC Imabari

Teams relegated from Japan Football League
Ryutsu Keizai Dragons

Teams promoted to Japan Football League
 Iwaki FC
 Kochi United SC

J1 League

J2 League

J3 League

Japan Football League

National team

Results

Women's football

Promotion and relegation
Team(s) relegated from Nadeshiko Division 1
Ehime
Teams at the Division 1 play-offs
 Iga Kunoichi
 Elfen Saitama
Team(s) promoted to Nadeshiko Division 1
 Sfida Setagaya
Team(s) relegated from Nadeshiko Division 2
 Bunnys Kyoto
Team(s) at the Division 2 play-offs
 Nittaidai

Nadeshiko League (Division 1)

Nadeshiko League (Division 2)

National team

Results

Player statistics

References

 
Seasons in Japanese football